Lucius Henry O'Brien may refer to:

Sir Lucius O'Brien, 3rd Baronet (1731–1795), Irish politician 
Lucius O'Brien (priest) (1842–1913), Dean of Limerick in the Church of Ireland

See also
Lucius O'Brien (disambiguation)